Nara 2nd district (奈良2区 Nara ni-ku, more formally 奈良県第2区 Nara-ken dai-ni-ku) is a single-member electoral district for the House of Representatives, the lower house of the National Diet of Japan. It is located in Northern Nara and covers the cities of Yamatokōriyama, Tenri, Ikoma, the former village of Tsuge in current Nara City and the former Yamabe and Ikoma counties, i.e. Yamazoe Village and the towns of Ando, Ikaruga, Sangō and Heguri. As of September 2012, 298,107 voters were registered district, giving its voters above average vote weight.

After the introduction of first-past-the-post single-member districts, Nara 2nd district was first represented by Liberal Democratic newcomer Makoto Taki. In 2003, he lost the district to Democrat Tetsuji Nakamura, but won a seat in the Kinki proportional representation block. Taki was a postal privatization rebel in 2005 and joined the New Party Nippon ("New Party Japan"). The 2nd district went to Liberal Democrat Sanae Takaichi who had been a member of the House of Representatives from 1993 to 2003 (Nara At-large district as an independent in 1993, Nara 1st district for the New Frontier Party in 1996, Kinki PR block for the LDP in 2000). Taki only finished third, but again won a proportional seat – the only one of New Party Nippon's three seats in the country the party could hold. In 2009, Taki joined the Democratic Party and narrowly regained the 2nd district for the Democrats. Takaichi who had been a minister in the Abe cabinet remained Representative via the Kinki PR block. In 2012, Taki retired and Takaichi easily retook the district.

List of representatives

Recent election results

References 

Nara Prefecture
Districts of the House of Representatives (Japan)